Colleen Pinkney (born Colleen Marshall) is a Canadian curler from Truro, Nova Scotia. She is a 2009 and 2013 Canadian Senior champion skip and a two-time provincial senior champion. She won the World Senior Curling Championships in 2010.

Career
In 1988, Pinkney played in her first Tournament of Hearts, playing second for Judy Burgess. The team finished 3–8. In 2003, she made her second Hearts, playing third for Nancy McConnery. That team finished with a 5–6 record. She was also the alternate for Nancy McConnery in the 2009 Scotties Tournament of Hearts.

Pinkney won the 2009 Canadian Senior Curling Championships in Summerside by defeating British Columbia's Kathy Smiley in the final. She went on to represent Canada at the 2010 World Senior Curling Championships where her rink won Gold over Switzerland to take home Canada's 6th World Senior Curling Championship title. Pinkney won her second Canadian senior title in 2013, also in Summerside, by defeating Alberta's Deb Santos in the final. At the 2014 World Senior Curling Championships, she led Canada to a silver medal after losing to Scotland's Christine Cannon in the final.

External links
Tournament of Hearts Statistics

1957 births
Curlers from Nova Scotia
Living people
People from Truro, Nova Scotia
Canadian women curlers